Nagycenk is a village in Győr-Moson-Sopron county, Hungary.

Places of interest
 Saint Stephen's Church
 Széchenyi Mansion
 Széchenyi Mausoleum

External links

  in Hungarian, English and German
 Street map 

Populated places in Győr-Moson-Sopron County